Kologriv is a town and the administrative center of Kologrivsky District in Kostroma Oblast, Russia, located on the left bank of the Unzha River  northeast of Kostroma, the administrative center of the oblast. Population:

History
Kologriv is first mentioned in chronicles in the beginning of the 16th century.  It was granted town status in 1778.

Geography

Climate

Administrative and municipal status
Within the framework of administrative divisions, Kologriv serves as the administrative center of the Kologrivsky District. As an administrative division, it includes seven rural localities, incorporated within Kologrivsky District as the town of district significance of Kologriv. As a municipal division, the town of district significance of Kologriv is incorporated within Kologrivsky Municipal District as Kologriv Urban Settlement.

Notable people
Olga Ladyzhenskaya (1922–2004), mathematician
Gennady Ladyzhensky (1852–1916), painter

References

Notes

Sources

Cities and towns in Kostroma Oblast
Kologrivsky Uyezd
Kologrivsky District